The 2016 Blu Panorama Airlines Tennis Cup was a professional tennis tournament played on clay courts. It was the second edition of the tournament which was part of the 2016 ATP Challenger Tour. It took place in Perugia, Italy between 13 and 19 June 2016.

Singles main-draw entrants

Seeds

 1 Rankings are as of June 6, 2016.

Other entrants
The following players received wildcards into the singles main draw:
  Stefano Napolitano
  Andrea Pellegrino
  Gianluigi Quinzi
  Lorenzo Sonego

The following player entered the main draw as an alternate:
  Juan Ignacio Londero

The following players received entry from the qualifying draw:
  Nicolás Barrientos
  Daniel Elahi Galán
  Yannick Maden
  Gianluca Mager

The following players received entry as a lucky losers:
  Marco Bortolotti
  Marcelo Zormann

Champions

Singles

  Nicolás Kicker def.  Blaž Rola, 2–6, 6–3, 6–0

Doubles

  Rogério Dutra Silva /  Andrés Molteni def.  Nicolás Barrientos /  Fabrício Neis, 7–5, 6–3

External links
Official Website

Blu Panorama Airlines Tennis Cup
Internazionali di Tennis Città di Perugia
June 2016 sports events in Italy
2016 in Italian tennis